Leptoconops gravesi is an extinct species of biting midge belonging to the family Ceratopogonidae. This species was described from fossilized remains preserved in Late Cretaceous amber from Vendée, France. The piece of amber containing the holotype specimen also preserved a scelionine wasp and an earwig nymph.

This species was named in honor of Didier Graves, the collector of the holotype specimen.

References

†
†
Prehistoric insects of Europe
†
Fossil taxa described in 2014
Prehistoric Diptera